Syria competed at the 2020 Summer Paralympics in Tokyo, Japan, from 24 August to 5 September 2021.

Competitors
The following is the list of number of competitors in the Games.

Athletics 

One Syrian male athlete, Mohamad Mohamad (Javelin Throw & Shot Put F57), successfully to break through the qualifications for the 2020 Paralympics after breaking the two events qualification limit.

Men's Field

References 

2020
Nations at the 2020 Summer Paralympics